Tuala Falani Chan Tung is a Samoan diplomat and public servant. He served as Samoan Ambassador to Belgium and the European Union from 2005 to 2012.

Tuala commenced his schooling in Samoa and then pursued studies overseas where obtaining BA and MA degrees in Economics. Tuala started working in the Department of Economic Development which latter became the Department of Trade, Commerce and Industry, eventually becoming its chief executive officer. Following a major restructuring, in which the Samoan governments 26 government departments and ministries were reduced through merging into 18 of them, Tuala was retained as the trade consultant with the Ministry of Foreign Affairs and Trade. In September 2005 he was appointed as Ambassador to Belgium and the European Union, replacing retiring Samoa Ambassador H. E. Tauiliili William Meredith. He currently serves on the board of the Central Bank of Samoa.
 
He holds the matai title Tuala from the village of Leauvaa.

References

Samoan people of Chinese descent
Ambassadors of Samoa to Belgium
Ambassadors of Samoa to the European Union
Living people
Year of birth missing (living people)